Joaquín Collar Serra (25 November 1906 - 20 June 1933) was a Spanish military aviator. He was born in Figueras, Spain.

Flight

In 1933, together with Mariano Barberán y Tros de Ilarduya and Sergeant Modesto Madariaga, he flew the Cuatro Vientos, a Br.19 TF Super Bidon built specially for this flight, from Spain to Cuba. The flight, which took 39 hours and 55 minutes, departed Seville on at 4:40 on 10 June 1933 and arrived in Camagüey at 20:45 (local time) on 11 June 1933, after a flight of 7320 km.

Disappearance
The plane departed for Mexico City on 20 June 1933, without Madariaga on board, and disappeared in flight, being last sighted in the vicinity of Villahermosa, Mexico. No trace of the plane or of its two occupants was subsequently found.

See also
 List of people who disappeared

References

External links
La hazaña de los pilotos españoles Barberán y Collar

1906 births
1930s missing person cases
1933 deaths
Aviators killed in aviation accidents or incidents
Missing aviators
Missing person cases in Mexico
Spanish aviators
Victims of aviation accidents or incidents in 1933